Obatzda  (also  spelt Obazda and Obatzter) is a Bavarian cheese spread. It is prepared by mixing two thirds aged soft cheese, usually Camembert (Romadur or similar cheeses may be used as well) and one third butter.

Sweet or hot paprika powder, salt and pepper are the traditional seasonings, as well as a small amount of beer.  An optional amount of onions, garlic, horseradish, cloves and ground or roasted caraway seeds may be used and some cream or cream cheese as well. The cheeses and spices are mixed together into a more or less smooth mass according to taste. It is usually eaten spread on bread or pretzels. Obatzda is a classic example of Bavarian biergarten food.

A similar Austrian/Hungarian/Slovak recipe is called Liptauer which uses fresh curd cheese as a substitute for the soft cheeses and the butter, but uses about the same spice mix.

In 2015, within the EU, obatzda was granted PGI certification.

See also 
 Fromage fort
 German cuisine
 List of German cheeses
 List of cheeses
 List of spreads

References

External links 
 A Bavarian beer garden classic: "Obatzda"

Snack foods
German cheeses
Cheese dishes
Bavarian cuisine
Spreads (food)
German products with protected designation of origin